Cameron McGriff (born September 30, 1997) is an American professional basketball player for Le Mans of the French Pro A. He played college basketball for the Oklahoma State Cowboys.

Early life and high school career
McGriff grew up mainly playing flag football. His parents, Octavia Goodman and Nate McGriff, were separated, with his father working three jobs. He began focusing on basketball as he grew taller and could dunk by sixth grade. McGriff attended South Grand Prairie High School in Grand Prairie, Texas. As a senior, he averaged 14.3 points and 7.4 rebounds per game. He was ranked the 10th best recruit in Texas by ESPN and the No. 113 in his high school class by Rivals. McGriff committed to playing college basketball for Oklahoma State, choosing the Cowboys over Arkansas in part because he thought they would help him reach the NBA.

College career
Entering his freshman season at Oklahoma State, McGriff's new college teammate and friend, Tyrek Coger, collapsed and died of an enlarged heart during summer workouts. As a freshman, McGriff averaged 3.8 points and 3.1 rebounds in 15.7 minutes per game while showcasing his dunking ability, including a dunk against Georgetown that appeared on SportsCenter's Top 10. Before his sophomore season, he improved his jump shot, making 1,000 shots each day. As a sophomore, he averaged 8.4 points and 5.4 rebounds per game and helped the team reach the National Invitational Tournament quarterfinals. In November 2018, McGriff scored 28 points in a win against LSU. 

As a junior, McGriff averaged 12.3 points and 7.4 rebounds per game, shooting 38 percent. On February 22, 2020, he tied his career-high of 28 points and had seven rebounds in a 83–66 win over Oklahoma. He averaged 12.3 points and 6.6 rebounds per game as a senior on a team that finished 18–14. McGriff averaged 19 points per game on the final six games of the season and was named the team's most valuable player by the Tulsa World. He was also named All-Big 12 Honorable Mention.

Professional career

Okapi Aalst (2020–2021)
On June 14, 2020, McGriff signed his first professional contract with Okapi Aalst of the Pro Basketball League (PBL) in Belgium. He left the team after the season after averaging 13.4 points and 4.9 rebounds per game in the PBL.

Greensboro Swarm / Portland Trail Blazers (2021–2022)
On October 8, 2021, McGriff signed with the Charlotte Hornets, but was waived six days later. On October 24, he signed with the Greensboro Swarm as an affiliate player. In 14 games, McGriff averaged 10.2 points, 4.9 rebounds and 1.4 assists per game.

On December 25, 2021, McGriff signed a 10-day contract with the Portland Trail Blazers via the hardship exception. He appeared in three games for the Trail Blazers, averaging  4.7 points and 5.0 rebounds per game. On January 2, 2022, McGriff entered the NBA's COVID-19 health and safety protocols.

On January 5, McGriff was reacquired by the Greensboro Swarm. On January 31, he was suspended for one game without pay for leaving the bench during an altercation between the Swarm and the Wisconsin Herd two days earlier.

Capitanes de Arecibo (2022)
On April 21, 2022, McGriff signed with the Capitanes de Arecibo of the BSN.

AEK Athens (2022–2023)
On July 19, 2022, McGriff signed a one-year contract with Greek club AEK Athens. On February 27, 2023, McGriff parted ways with the club. He averaged 9.1 points and 4.8 rebounds in domestic competition, as well as 6 points and 3.9 rebounds in the BCL.

Le Mans (2023–present)
On February 27, 2023, McGriff signed with Le Mans of the French Pro A.

Career statistics

NBA

|-
| style="text-align:left;"| 
| style="text-align:left;"| Portland
| 3 || 0 || 15.3 || .357 || .333 || 1.000 || 5.0 || 1.0 || .0 || .3 || 4.7
|- class="sortbottom"
| style="text-align:center;" colspan="2"| Career
| 3 || 0 || 15.3 || .357 || .333 || 1.000 || 5.0 || 1.0 || .0 || .3 || 4.7

College

|-
| style="text-align:left;"| 2016–17
| style="text-align:left;"| Oklahoma State
| 32 || 1 || 15.7 || .405 || .286 || .730 || 3.1 || .6 || .5 || .3 || 3.8
|-
| style="text-align:left;"| 2017–18
| style="text-align:left;"| Oklahoma State
| 36 || 17 || 24.1 || .480 || .368 || .865 || 5.4 || 1.0 || .8 || .5 || 8.4
|-
| style="text-align:left;"| 2018–19
| style="text-align:left;"| Oklahoma State
| 32 || 32 || 33.8 || .381 || .298 || .764 || 7.4 || 1.7 || 1.2 || .8 || 12.3
|-
| style="text-align:left;"| 2019–20
| style="text-align:left;"| Oklahoma State
| 32 || 32 || 30.1 || .450 || .308 || .832 || 6.6 || 1.3 || .4 || .3 || 12.3
|- class="sortbottom"
| style="text-align:center;" colspan="2"| Career
| 132 || 82 || 25.9 || .427 || .313 || .802 || 5.6 || 1.1 || .7 || .5 || 9.2

References

External links
Oklahoma State Cowboys bio

1997 births
Living people
AEK B.C. players
American men's basketball players
American expatriate basketball people in Belgium
American expatriate basketball people in Greece
Basketball players from Texas
Capitanes de Arecibo players
Greensboro Swarm players
Okapi Aalstar players
Oklahoma State Cowboys basketball players
People from Grand Prairie, Texas
Portland Trail Blazers players
Power forwards (basketball)
Small forwards
Undrafted National Basketball Association players